Elizabeth of Aragon, more commonly known as Saint Elizabeth of Portugal, T.O.S.F. (1271 – 4 July 1336; Elisabet in Catalan, Isabel in Aragonese, Portuguese and Spanish), was queen consort of Portugal, a tertiary of the Franciscan Order and is venerated as a saint of the Catholic Church.

Family and early life 

Born in 1271 into the royal house of Aragon, Elizabeth was the daughter of Infante Peter (later King Peter III) and his wife Constance of Sicily and the sister of three kings: Alfonso II and James II of Aragon and Frederick III of Sicily.

Great niece and namesake of Elizabeth of Hungary, she was the original source of the bread to roses miracle often depicted in art of her better known great aunt. The kingly suspicion of generosity to poor people is far more characteristic of her warlike and abusive husband than Elizabeth of Hungary's loving and pious spouse, Louis.

Elizabeth was educated very piously, and led a life of strict regularity from her childhood: she said the full Divine Office daily, fasted and did other penances.

Marriage
Her marriage to King Denis of Portugal was arranged in 1281 when she was 10 years old, receiving the towns of Óbidos, Abrantes and Porto de Mós as part of her dowry. It was only in 1288 that the wedding was celebrated, when Denis was 26 years old, while Elizabeth was 17. Denis, a poet and statesman, was known as the Rei Lavrador, because he planted a large pine forest near Leiria to prevent the soil degradation that threatened the region.

Elizabeth quietly pursued the regular religious practices of her youth and was devoted to the poor and sick. Such a life was taken as a reproach to many around her and caused ill will in some quarters. Eventually, her prayer and patience succeeded in converting her husband, who had been leading a sinful life of spousal abuse and  adultery.

Elizabeth took an active interest in Portuguese politics and was a decisive conciliator during the negotiations concerning the Treaty of Alcañices, signed by Denis and Fernando IV of Castile in 1297 (which fixed the borders between the two countries). In 1304, the Queen and Denis returned to Spain to arbitrate between Fernando IV of Castile and James II of Aragon, brother of Elizabeth.

She had two children, a daughter named Constance, who married King Ferdinand IV of Castile and also a son Afonso (who later became King Afonso IV of Portugal).Elizabeth would serve as intermediary between her husband and Afonso, during the Civil War between 1322 and 1324. The Infante greatly resented the king, whom he accused of favoring the king's illegitimate son, Afonso Sanches. Repulsed to Alenquer, which supported the Infante, Denis was prevented from killing his son through the intervention of the Queen, when she, in 1323, mounted on a mule, positioned herself between both opposing armies on the field of Alvalade in order to prevent the combat. Peace returned in 1324, once the illegitimate son was sent into exile, and the Infante swore loyalty to the king.

Dowager Queen
After Denis' death in 1325, Elizabeth retired to the monastery of the Poor Clare nuns, now known as the Monastery of Santa Clara-a-Velha (which she had founded in 1314) in Coimbra. She joined the Third Order of St. Francis, devoting the rest of her life to the poor and sick in obscurity. During the great famine in 1293, she donated flour from her cellars to the starving in Coimbra. She was also known for being modest in her dress and humble in conversation, for providing lodging for pilgrims, distributing small gifts, paying the dowries of poor girls, and educating the children of poor nobles. She was a benefactor of various hospitals (Coimbra, Santarém and Leiria) and of religious projects (such as the Trinity Convent in Lisbon, chapels in Leiria and Óbidos, and the cloister in Alcobaça).

She was called to act once more as a peacemaker in 1336, when Afonso IV marched his troops against King Alfonso XI of Castile, to whom he had married his daughter Maria, and who had neglected and ill-treated her. In spite of age and weakness, the Queen-dowager insisted on hurrying to Estremoz, where the two kings' armies were drawn up. She again stopped the fighting and caused terms of peace to be arranged. But the exertion brought on her final illness. As soon as her mission was completed, she took to her bed with a fever from which she died on 4 July, in the castle of Estremoz. She earned the title of Peacemaker on account of her efficacy in solving disputes.

Although Denis' tomb was located in Odivelas, Elizabeth was buried in the Convent of Santa Clara in Coimbra, in a magnificent Gothic sarcophagus. After frequent flooding by the Mondego River in the 17th century, the Poor Clares moved her mortal remains to the Monastery of Santa Clara-a-Nova (also in Coimbra). Her body was transferred to the main chapel, where it was buried in a sarcophagus of silver and crystal.

Sainthood

She was beatified in 1516 and canonized by Pope Urban VIII on 24 June 1626. Her feast was inserted in the General Roman Calendar for celebration on 4 July. In the year 1694 Pope Innocent XII moved her feast to 8 July, so it would not conflict with the celebration of the Octave of Saints Peter and Paul, Apostles. In 1955, Pope Pius XII abolished this octave. The 1962 Roman Missal changed the rank of the feast from "Double" to "Third-Class Feast". The 1969 revision of the Calendar classified the celebration as an optional memorial and restored it to 4 July. Her feast is also kept on the Franciscan Calendar of Saints. Since the establishment in 1819 of the Diocese of San Cristóbal de La Laguna (Canary Islands, Spain),  Saint Elizabeth is the co-patron of the diocese and of its cathedral pursuant to the papal bull issued by Pope Pius VII.
In the United States her memorial has been transferred to 5 July since 4 July is the date of the independence of that nation, a national holiday.

Elizabeth is usually depicted in royal garb with a dove or an olive branch.

Popular culture
She was the subject of a 1947 Portuguese-Spanish film, The Holy Queen, in which she was played by Maruchi Fresno. In Portuguese popular culture, she is commonly associated with a "miracle of the roses".

The young adult historical fantasy novel A Curse of Roses by Portuguese author Diana Pinguicha retells her story as a princess who can turn food into flowers and falls for an Enchanted Moura.

References

Bibliography 

 "Saint Elizabeth, Queen of Portugal", Butler's Lives of the Saints

External links
 Colonnade Statue at St Peter's Square

|-

1271 births
1336 deaths
Portuguese queens consort
Portuguese Roman Catholic saints
House of Aragon
13th-century people from the Kingdom of Aragon
14th-century people from the Kingdom of Aragon
13th-century Portuguese people
14th-century Portuguese people
13th-century Spanish women
14th-century Spanish women
13th-century Portuguese women
14th-century Portuguese women
14th-century Christian saints
Aragonese infantas
Franciscan saints
Members of the Third Order of Saint Francis
Roman Catholic royal saints
Female saints of medieval Portugal
Female saints of medieval Spain
Medieval Spanish saints
Medieval Portuguese saints
People from Coimbra
Canonizations by Pope Urban VIII
Royal reburials
Daughters of kings
Queen mothers